The Governor-General of Pakistan was the representative of the Pakistani monarch in the Dominion of Pakistan, established by the Indian Independence Act 1947. The office of governor-general was abolished when Pakistan became an Islamic republic in 1956.

Constitutional role

Pakistan was one of the realms of the Commonwealth of Nations that shared the same person as sovereign and head of state. The Pakistani monarch was represented in the dominion by the governor-general of Pakistan, who was appointed by the monarch on the advice of the Pakistani government.

The Pakistani monarch and the Federal Legislature of Pakistan constituted the Parliament of Pakistan. All executive powers of Pakistan rested with the sovereign. All laws in Pakistan were enacted only with the granting of royal assent, granted by the governor-general on behalf of the sovereign. The governor-general was also responsible for summoning, proroguing, and dissolving the Federal Legislature. The governor-general had the power to choose and appoint the Council of Ministers and could dismiss them under his discretion. All Pakistani ministers of the Crown held office at the pleasure of the governor-general. The Governor-General of Pakistan was also exempted from any proceedings against him in any Pakistani court.

Oath of office
The Governor-General of Pakistan was required to take an oath of allegiance to the Constitution of Pakistan as well as to the Pakistani monarch before being permitted to assume his seat. The oath of allegiance taken by Mohammad Ali Jinnah, the first Governor-General, was as follows:

List of Governors-General of Pakistan
The following is a list of people who served as governor-general of Pakistan.

Flag of the Governor-General

See also
 Governor-General of India
 List of presidents of Pakistan
 President of Pakistan

References

 
Pakistan
Pakistan and the Commonwealth of Nations
Lists of political office-holders in Pakistan
Pakistan history-related lists